Alipur-1 village comes under the Jalandhar East development block of Jalandhar. Jalandhar is a district in the Indian state of Punjab.

About 
Alipur-1 lies on the Jalandhar-Nakodar road. Jamsher is the closest railway station, 4 km away. It falls under Jalandhar Cantt constituency.

References 

Villages in Jalandhar district